Queen of Swords is a Canadian action–adventure television series set in California during the early 19th century that ran for one season from 2000 to 2001.

The series premiered October 7, 2000. After filming had been completed on 22 episodes and the first eight episodes were broadcast, the series was cancelled.

Plot
In 1817, a young Spanish aristocrat, Tessa Alvarado, returns to Spanish California after the death of her father and finds her home in ruins, her father's manservant reduced to stealing. The town where she was born is run by a militaristic governor who abuses his power, resulting in the miscarriage of justice and the poor living conditions of his subjects. Upset about the state of her birthplace and the murder of her father, Tessa's path is revealed to her in a mysterious dream where her father comes to her and talks of his murder, his hidden gold, and of his "avenging angel". She will take up arms to protect the people from the town's governor and to avenge her father's death. Tessa will do this in disguise behind a mask, becoming that avenging angel, the Queen of Swords.

As the Queen of Swords, Tessa becomes a vision of hope for the people who live in her long oppressed town.

Characters
Tessa Alvarado/Queen of Swords (Tessie Santiago). Doña María Teresa (Tessa) Alvarado, born in California and sent by her father, Don Alvarado, to Madrid at the age of seven to further her education. In her early twenties, Tessa has been taking fencing lessons from Maestro Juan Torres (Anthony De Longis), when she learns of her father's death and returns to California to take over her father's hacienda. The Queen is never depicted as physically stronger than her opponents, winning by being more skilled or using the element of surprise and when the odds are too great, running away to fight another day.
Marta (Paulina Gálvez), a gypsy employed to look after Tessa when she arrived in Madrid to live with her uncle, aunt, and three cousins. She returns with Tessa and keeps her feet on the ground with home truths about her life and destiny. Marta has great knowledge of the tarot. The Queen of Swords name comes from one of Marta's tarot cards.
Colonel Luis Ramirez Montoya (Valentine Pelka), son of a lowly diplomat and a wealthy mother. The corrupt and tyrannical governor of Santa Helena, ruthless and cares little for human life other than his own. He believes in executions without fair trials, enslaves the poor people of the town, and blackmails the powerful Dons and has the knowledge to hold Grisham and Vera under his thumb.
Captain Marcus Grisham (Anthony Lemke), an American deserter who escaped execution for killing his commanding officer during the War of 1812. His own self-interests test his loyalty to Montoya on a number of occasions and the mission of ridding Montoya of the troublesome Queen of Swords, which his soldiers have a hard time accomplishing due in part to the inaccurate single shot weapons.
Señora Vera Hidalgo (Elsa Pataky), the young and unfaithful trophy wife of Don Hidalgo (Tacho González) with a dubious past. Friend of Tessa, lover of Captain Grisham, and spy for him and Colonel Montoya.
Don Gaspar Hidalgo (Tacho Gonzalez), along with Tessa's late father, is one of the richest and influential among the Dons.
Dr. Robert Helm (Peter Wingfield), an English doctor employed by Montoya to tend his soldiers and local citizenry who believes in saving lives rather than taking them after his experiences as an officer in the Napoleonic Wars. He has little patience for Tessa, believing her to be a spoiled member of the nobility and less for the Queen of Swords, despising her because of her use of violence and willingness to kill. Helm's relationship with the Queen of Swords intensifies throughout the series as events throw them together in life-threatening situations.

As in the theme song "Behind the Mask", all the characters have secrets to hide, which are explored over the 22 episodes.

Production

Casting
Almost immediately after signing with an agent, series star Tessie Santiago went to her first professional audition, to an open casting call that Fireworks Entertainment was conducting in a nationwide search for the lead role. Though a blonde with light skin and light eyes, Santiago knew that TV had a long history of relying on clichés and stereotypes and the typical look of a Latina, and she thus dyed her hair black a week before the audition and read for the part. It led to several callbacks, with a final test screening in Los Angeles, California, and she won the lead role of Tessa Alvarado.

The part of Colonel Montoya was written specifically for Valentine Pelka by David Abramowitz, who phoned Pelka in October 1999 to offer him the part, subject to approval by the other show producers.

Abramowitz met Peter Wingfield at a Highlander convention in November 1999 and offered him the parts of Doctor Helm or Captain Grisham. Wingfield chose the doctor as a part with more mileage and more challenging.

Filming
Director of photography Alwyn Kumst used Super 16mm film, which has a slightly smaller widescreen aspect ratio to 16:9.

The series was filmed May 3, 2000 to December 12, 2000, in Spain, principally at Texas Hollywood, Almería and the surrounding Tabernas Desert with coastal locations at San José near Almería. The Alcazaba of Almería was used as Madrid and the gardens as Don Hidalgo's hacienda garden. The Western buildings of Texas Hollywood were also used for the series, with the Western jail serving as the Spanish jail, and one of the large Western buildings was converted into a sound stage containing the living quarters of both Senorita Alvarado and Col. Montoya.

The flashback episode "End of Days" had new material of approximately 22 minutes, which were filmed in Spain, and its interior mine scenes were filmed at Pinewood Studios, London.

The first episode to be filmed was "Death to the Queen", directed by Jon Cassar, who set the style of the series. The soldiers's uniforms were changed after this episode to resemble a uniform that, more realistically, would have been used in a Spanish backwater community. "Vengeance" was the second episode to be filmed and was directed by Brian Grant. Next Jon Cassar stepped in to direct episode one, "Destiny" which was the third episode to be filmed. "Destiny" was written by James Thorpe using the same sets for the Napoleonic Wars scenes that director Brian Grant was using to film "Vengeance" at the same time. During 2009 personal correspondence with Jon Cassar, this process was clarified as follows: "That is exactly how we shot those shows." He noted that "it takes as long to prep[are] a show as to shoot it. So I directed the first one, [and] while I prepped the third, another director shot the second, then I shot the third. So once I was there I didn't leave until I was done."

Locations

Horses
Horse stunt co-ordinator Ricardo Cruz supplied and trained the horses throughout the series which included the Queen's horse, Captain Grisham's white horse, and a highly trained black horse for Colonel Montoya. Cruz, credited as Richard Cruz, had one credited part in the episode "The Witness".

The Queen's horse is called Chico, his real name, mentioned only once in the entire series in the episode "The Pretender". He had two stunt horse doubles, Champion and Escandalo, for different action scenes. His bridle and breastplate were identical to that used by Zorro's horse in the Alain Delon film Zorro (1975) and the U.S. television series Zorro (1990). The film and TV series were filmed in Spain.

The white horse that Grisham rides is named Montero and was the horse ridden by Russell Crowe in Gladiator, a film Ricardo Cruz worked on.

While playing the role of Colonel Montoya, Valentine Pelka rode the horse named Salan. Salan died at the end of filming the series.

Bo Derek, an accomplished rider, chose the horse she would ride in the episode "The Witness" after putting two Palominos through their paces.

Stunts
Anthony De Longis was the Swordmaster/Stunt Co-ordinator on the first six production episodes (101-107, not 105). He is not credited in episode 104 because the 'film rushes' from the last sword-fight scene were lost on the way to Canada for processing and editing. So the scenes had to be reshot with French swordmaster Albert Goldberg who is credited with the entire episode.

The Queen of Swords was portrayed by newcomer Tessie Santiago, who provided the voice, close-up face of the character, and character interaction. Anthony De Longis trained Tessie Santiago for two months in pre-production in California in the use of the rapier and dagger in the Spanish mysterious circle (Destreza) style, and use of the whip. He purposely created complicated and extended phrases of rapier and dagger choreography and taught them to Tessie Santiago, as he recognized that, in episodic television, time is always restricted. There was a month off between training and cameras rolling in Spain with only a few days of prep before Santiago climbed to the top of a cliff to shoot her first scene in "Death to the Queen". This was a two-on-one fight scene in 40 mph winds and with a little adjustment and fine-tuning to location and situation, Santiago was able to perform all her own swordplay confidently in this opening sequence.

Three other women helped portray the Queen of Swords. A double stands in for the "star" actor for long shots. This happened in a few instances in Queen of Swords, such as in the shot of the Queen lying on the beach face down in the episode "Death to the Queen", or the shot in the same episode of the Queen's gloved hands being loosened from their bindings. The main character in Queen of Swords required great skill in horseback riding, swordsmanship, the bullwhip, and knife fighting.

Natalia Guijarro Brasseur was originally hired to perform the role of the Queen in scenes requiring specific physical skills. Some of the American producers of the series included the producers of Highlander: The Series, as well as the swordmaster Anthony De Longis. But during initial rehearsals for the series in Spain, before filming began, De Longis and producer Ken Gord recognized that Natalia Brasseur was not as talented with the sword as they needed. This forced Los Angeles-based executive producer David Abramowitz to contact the fencing instructor/actress/swordmaster who had tested and helped producers cast the role of the Queen of Swords, Roberta Brown. Brown was flown to Spain, where she appeared in the first five episodes as sword double for the Queen. She also appeared as Marta in carriage-chase scenes and Mary Rose's sword double in the seventh episode. In the meantime, Brasseur doubled for the Queen in stunt horse scenes and some falls. When the producers found that they needed to use their limited American visas for other guest stars and crew members, De Longis and Brown were dismissed from the series before the first hiatus in filming. The producers brought in French fencer Gaëlle Cohen as a replacement.

Other performers who portrayed the Queen during the series included Mary Gallien (who later became Dr. Mary De Longis) and Mary Jose. In the episode "Hanged Man", male stuntman Curro doubled for the Queen to perform one of the most dangerous stunts in a Western involving a moving wagon and horses, when dressed as the Queen, Curro jumped from the wagon onto the horses then passed under the horses and wagon, grabbed a trailing rope and was dragged along the ground from where he hauled himself back on to the rear of the wagon. This was performed in the style of Yakima Canutt, who had first performed the stunt in the films Stagecoach and Riders of the Dawn.

Regarding the need for so many performers for one character, swordmaster Anthony De Longis wrote on his website: "You don't learn sword skills over night, especially when you're busy performing all the other action for a new episode every week."

The need for four women to perform the role of the Queen is exemplified in the Queen's run up the hill away from the soldiers in "Death to the Queen". Mary Gallien started the run up the hill, Roberta Brown performed the medium shot duel with swords on the hill, Tessie Santiago performed the spoken parts and was in the close-up, and Natalia Brasseur fell off the cliff as the Queen of Swords.

Jean-Louis Airola became swordmaster/stunt co-ordinator on episodes 105, 108–119. Michel Carliez episodes 120, 121 (Spain), 122. Richard Hammatt 121 (London).

Music
The show's incidental music was composed by Phillip Stanger, with music editor Kevin Banks and additional music byJohn Herberman.

The show's theme, a song titled "Behind the Mask", was written and composed by Spencer Proffer and Steve Plunkett and performed by José Feliciano.
Only the last verse is featured in the opening titles. The full unpublished English version is available on YouTube, sung by José Feliciano with Spencer Proffer and Steve Plunkett, and a promotional video exists of José Feliciano in Spanish but again never released; this was filmed by Tom Laurie at The Texas Hollywood Studios, Tabernas, Almería, Spain.

Cast

Guest stars include David Carradine, Cyrielle Clair, Bo Derek, Cristián de la Fuente, Daisy Fuentes, Elizabeth Gracen, Sung-Hi Lee, Simon MacCorkindale, Ralf Moeller, and Jose Sancho.
 
While credited as a full cast member, Peter Wingfield appears in 9 episodes plus a flashback episode.

Peter Wingfield, Elizabeth Gracen and Valentine Pelka all worked together in Highlander: The Series as recurring characters. Pelka, also, guest starred in the 1990 series Zorro, filmed in Madrid, in the episode "All That Glitters".

British actors played many Spanish parts: Valentine Pelka (Colonel Montoya), Ed Stoppard (Ambassador Ramirez), Grant Russell (Uncle Alejandro), Freddy Douglas (Ramon), Dan Fredenburgh (Tedora Selvera), Richard Clifford (The Viceroy), Steve Emerson (Padre Quinterra), Stephen Billington (Bernardo), Oliver Haden (Leonardo), Alex Hassell (Andreo Rey), Neil Newborn (Anton), Frank Barrie (Gonzalo), and Darrell D'Silva (Armando). Yasmin Bannerman played a black slave (Agatha) and Burt Kwouk played a Japanese warrior priest. Other British actors included Peter Wingfield (Dr. Helm), James Innes-Smith (Latham), Edward Hughes (Ian Latham), Michael Culkin (Edward Wellersley), Simon MacCorkindale (Capt. Charles Wentworth), Amanda Batty (Camila Wentworth), and Darren Tighe (Fenner).

Episodes

Accolades

Broadcast
Despite being a part UK production it was not shown in the UK until 2008 on the Zone Thriller channel. It was shown in a cropped 4/3 pan and scan format, although it had been filmed in wide-screen 16/9, with some profanities and scenes deleted as compared to transmissions in other countries. In December 2009 it moved to the Film24 channel as well as continuing on Zone Thriller's successor CBS Action. Zone Thriller and CBS Action broadcast in production order and Film24 in Episode order.

Also known as

France: Tessa, à la pointe de l'épée (DVD; Sous le signe de l'épée)
Spain: Reina de Espadas
Portugal: Raínha de Espadas
Hungary: A Kardok királynöje
Finland: Miekan lumo
Estonia: Mõõgakuninganna
Poland: Królowa miecza
Greece: Vasilissa tou xifous I
Italy: La regina di spade
Russian dub. in Ukrainian TV: Королева мечей
Ukrainian: Королева мечів
Bulgaria: Царицата на рапирите
Germany: Die Maske der Königin
Kosova: Mbretëresha e shpatave
Slovakia: Kráľovná mečov

Home media

VHS release
A limited edition VHS set with all 22 episodes was released at the end of 2001, when after the show had been cancelled, a cult following had grown. A small survey had been done with fans of the show by the show's producers, Fireworks Entertainment, where fans had voted for a VHS release at the then official Queen of Swords website (Fireworks noted they would not be making DVD collections of the series during the survey). The set was manufactured in Canada by Fireworks themselves and was sold by CanWest Global. It was made available only through online ordering to customers in the United States and Canada (NTSC region 1 format) through the official Queen of Swords website linked through Fireworks' official website at the time. It was an 8 volume VHS set, limited to under 1,000 sets made. The first tape contained episode 1 while the remaining 7 tapes contained 3 episodes each, with the series presented in the cropped broadcast 4:3 pan and scan format. The set cost $99.99 US/$149.99 Canada, plus shipping costs. A certificate of authenticity card sheet was also released with the set, inside the box of the first tape volume. The VHS set sold out within months. A promised special addition to the first episode's tape was not included with initial earlier pressed tapes delivered to customers, a ninth tape (which was a re-issue of the first episode volume, this time with the bonus content added at the end; the bonus material included was a lengthy set of clips and promo scenes from the series with the theme song "Behind the Mask" being played) was later sent to all who purchased the sets from CanWest. Subsequent orders that were made afterward were with the corrected volume 1 video.

DVD release
In Japan the series was released between July and November in 2004 by Happinet Pictures. There were ten DVDs available in total. There were two episodes per DVD combined into one 85 minute film with one opening title and a double credit list at the end. They were generally in no particular order and the two missing episodes are The Pretender and Takes a Thief. The DVDs are uncut Region 2 with the original English soundtrack, Japanese dubbing, and Japanese subtitles 4:3 Pan and scan NTSC, with Dolby Digital sound.

In France the series was released in 2006 by Elephant Films under the title 'Sous Le Signe de L'Épée'. The DVDs are the French version Tessa, à la pointe de l'épée uncut on a multiregion in a six DVD box set with the original English soundtrack, French dubbing, and French subtitles, 16:9 widescreen as it was filmed, in PAL with Dolby Digital sound. The episodes are in production order (see List of episodes). Includes an episode booklet in French.

Legal issues
In August 2000, writer Linda S. Lukens sought a preliminary injunction to block the premiere of Queen of Swords unless she were given a "created by" credit, saying she had submitted a script of that name and a similar series treatment to ABC two decades earlier, and that both she and the show's executive producer, David Abramowitz, were both represented by the Broder/Kurland Agency, which was also named in the suit. In October 2000, a Los Angeles Superior Court judge ordered a halt to further broadcasts of the show unless Lukens received that credit. Linda Lukens is not credited on the official Japanese or French DVDs.

On January 24, 2001, Sony Pictures Entertainment filed a lawsuit in United States District Court, Central District of California, Western Division, against Fireworks Entertainment Group, the producers of Queen of Swords. Sony alleged copyright infringement and other claims, saying the series "copied protectable elements from [the] 'Zorro' character and 'Zorro' related works". On April 5, 2001, U.S. District Judge Collins, denied Sony's motion for a preliminary injunction, noting, among other points, "that since the copyrights in [Johnson McCulley's 1919 short story] The Curse of Capistrano and [the 1920 movie] The Mark of Zorro lapsed in 1995 or before, the character Zorro has been in the public domain". As to specific elements of The Mask of Zorro, the judge found that any similarities between the film and the TV series' secondary characters and plot elements were insufficient to warrant an injunction.

References

External links
 
 
 Queen of Swords at The TV IV
 Anthony DeLongis QoS pages
 Fort Bravo Texas Hollywood
 Content Films – the new owners of rights to Queen of Swords
 Content Films holding library link to Queen of Swords

 
Fictional fencers
Fictional swordfighters
Fictional whip users
Television series set in the 1810s
2000s Western (genre) television series
Television shows set in California
Global Television Network original programming
Television series produced at Pinewood Studios
2000s Canadian drama television series
2000 Canadian television series debuts
2001 Canadian television series endings
Canadian action adventure television series
Canadian Western (genre) television series
Television shows filmed in Spain